UFC on ESPN: Barboza vs. Gaethje (also known as UFC on ESPN 2) was a mixed martial arts event produced by the Ultimate Fighting Championship that was held on March 30, 2019 at the Wells Fargo Center in Philadelphia, Pennsylvania.

Background
This was the third UFC event in Philadelphia and the first since UFC 133 in August 2011.

A lightweight bout between Edson Barboza and former WSOF Lightweight Champion Justin Gaethje served as the event headliner.

A strawweight bout between Alexa Grasso and Marina Rodriguez was scheduled at UFC Fight Night: Assunção vs. Moraes 2. However, it was reported on December 17, that Rodriguez pulled out of the event due to a hand injury. The pairing was left intact and rescheduled for this event. In turn, it was reported that Grasso was pulled from the bout due to injury and replaced by former WSOF Women's Strawweight Champion Jessica Aguilar.

A bantamweight bout between former UFC Flyweight Championship challenger Ray Borg and Liu Pingyuan was scheduled to take place at the event. However, it was reported on March 13, that Liu was replaced by newcomer Kyler Phillips for an undisclosed reason. In turn, Phillips was removed from the card on March 25 for undisclosed reasons and replaced by Casey Kenney.

At the weigh-ins, Borg weighed in at 137.75 lb, 1.75 lb over the bantamweight non-title fight limit of 136 lb. He was fined 20% of his fight purse and his bout against Kenney proceeded at catchweight.

Results

Bonus awards
The following fighters were awarded $50,000 bonuses:
Fight of the Night: Justin Gaethje vs. Edson Barboza    
Performance of the Night: Jack Hermansson and Paul Craig

See also 

 List of UFC events
 2019 in UFC
 List of current UFC fighters

References 

UFC on ESPN
2019 in mixed martial arts
2019 in sports in Pennsylvania
March 2019 sports events in the United States
Mixed martial arts in Pennsylvania
Sports competitions in Philadelphia
Events in Philadelphia